Kladisoceras is a genus of Early Devonian fossil cephalopods included in the nautiloid order Discosorida.

References

 Kladisoceras Paleodb/fossilworks.
 Jack Sepkoski's list of Cephalopod genera, 

Prehistoric nautiloid genera
Discosorida